King Shava was the adopted father of Bahuka, as mentioned in the Mahabharata. 

He had multiple wives and mistresses, and according to folktale he had 1301 children.  He married his youngest wife after she was rejected by his son Bahuka.  He loved his youngest queen the most because they both had similar low, gruffy voices.  In some accounts they spoke with the same voice.
He stood eight feet tall and had multi-colored hair.

References
Acharya Chandrashekhar Shastri: Puranon ki anmol kahaniyan, 

Characters in Hindu mythology